Aspergillus persii is a species of fungus in the genus Aspergillus which can cause onychomycosis. and otomycosis https://www.sciencedirect.com/science/article/abs/pii/S1156523316000214

It is from the Circumdati section. Aspergillus persii produces xanthomegnin and ochratoxin A.

Growth and morphology

A. persii has been cultivated on both Czapek yeast extract agar (CYA) plates and Malt Extract Agar Oxoid® (MEAOX) plates. The growth morphology of the colonies can be seen in the pictures below.

References

Further reading 
 
 
 
 

 

persii
Fungi described in 2002